Kari-Jukka  Hietalahti (born 13 September 1964) is a Finnish actor and screenwriter.

Career
Kari Hietalahti is best known for having appeared in several popular Finnish television series, such as Vintiöt, Ihmisten puolue, and Roba, and in films such as Rööperi and Vares: Private Eye. In August 2011, Hietalahti's first book, Kenraali Pancho & Pojat – Suuri kalottikirja, was published.

In 2018, Hietalahti played Jari Aarnio in the crime drama series Keisari Aarnio, which is based on a true story.

Personal life
Hietalahti is married to costume designer Minna Härkönen. They have one son.

Selected filmography

Film

Television

References

External links
 

Finnish male film actors
1964 births
Finnish male television actors
Living people
20th-century Finnish male actors
21st-century Finnish male actors
People from Savonlinna